Alexander "Sándor" Wolf (born Eisenstadt 21 December 1871: died Haifa 2 January 1946) was an Austrian wine trader and collector of antiquities.   His collection formed the basis for the museum which he founded at Eisenstadt in 1926 and which has now become the Burgenland Regional Museum (Landesmuseum Burgenland).

Life
Sándor Wolf was the son of Ignatz Wolf and his wife Minna Gomperz/Wolf.  Ignatz Wolf headed up "Leopold Wolf Söhne", a business which had grown to become one of the largest wine wholesalers in the land.

Starting in 1901 Sándor organised a succession of archaeological excavations of prehistoric and Roman sites in and around Eisenstadt.   The abundance of findings from these activities formed the basis of what now became his collection of antiquities.   From 1920 he extended his activities to other, more recent periods, building a collection that reflected the history of Burgenland and, especially, the Jewish history of the region.   From this came his initiative to found, in 1926,  the Regional Museum ("Landesmuseum") in the "Leinnerhaus", a large originally baroque town house in Eisenstadt which had been used as a music school (among other things) during the nineteenth century and which was acquired by the Wolf family in 1918.

The collection continued to grow, notably with purchases from a major auction at Plankenwarth Castle ("Schloß Plankenwarth").   By 1932, without counting the archaeological items, the collection already comprised more than 5,800 objects.

Early in 1938 Austria was merged with Germany as part of Hitler's strategy for again redrawing the map of central Europe.   Government policy for Burgenland now became actively anti-Semitic.   Sándor Wolf, who was Jewish, found himself arrested by the Gestapo and forced "voluntarily" to surrender his assets and his collection.   Together with his sister, Frieda Löwy, he was forced to abandon his homeland, fleeing by way of Fiume and Triest to Palestine, where they acquired an estate in Haifa.   After the war they prepared to return home to Austria, but their preparations were interrupted at the last minute when Wolf died following a short and unexpected illness.

Museum and memorials 
In Eisenstadt the historic Wolf-Haus / Wolf-Museum is an integral part of the Burgenland Regional Museum (Landesmuseum) building.   Parts of the former Wolf collection were acquired from the regional government in 1958 and are on display on the Wolf-Haus section of the museum.

Today an Eisenstadt street has been named after him "Alexander-Wolf-Gasse".   The Wolf family mausoleum can be found in the so-called "Wolfsgarten" in the city's Oberberg quarter.

Further reading 
 Dieter Szorger: Sándor Wolf (1871–1946) Gründer des Landesmuseums. In: Burgenland. 90 Jahre – 90 Geschichten. Begleitband zur Ausstellung, Wissenschaftliche Arbeiten aus dem Burgenland (WAB) Band 137, Landesmuseum Burgenland, Eisenstadt 2011, S. 190f.

References

1871 births
1946 deaths
Austrian Ashkenazi Jews
Collectors
Ashkenazi Jews in Mandatory Palestine
People of Austrian-Jewish descent
Oberlander Jews
People from Eisenstadt